The Justice League of Earth are fictional characters, a supervillain team of the  31st Century in the DC Comics universe. They were created by Geoff Johns and Gary Frank and first appeared in Action Comics #859 (January 2008) as enemies of the Legion of Super-Heroes.

Fictional team history
The Justice League of Earth is a group of super-powered humans living on 31st Century Earth. They all auditioned for the Legion of Super-Heroes, but were rejected due to their powers being judged to be ineffective in battle. It was later revealed that they were actually rejected as telepathic probing revealed deep-rooted psychosis issues that would have made them potential threats. Over the time their powers mutated turning them all into considerable threats. These individuals fell under the sway of Earth-Man and his xenophobic claims that Superman was a native of Earth who worked hard to protect the planet from alien threats, in which purportedly one of Superman's greatest achievements is protecting the planet from the dreaded Martian Manhunter.

The Justice League of Earth spread their ideals of distrust and hatred against aliens across Earth and were able to successfully convince the planet's inhabitants into believing them, resulting in the planet falling under the dictatorship of Earth-Man, seceding from the United Planets, and a massive persecution of aliens among Earth's people. The Legion of Super-Heroes were also branded as fugitives for perpetuating the "lies" of Superman's true origins in which the Justice League of Earth was tasked into hunting them down. The Justice League of Earth captured many Legion members and this allowed them to have their powers absorbed by Earth-Man, and he used the Legionnaire Sun Boy to turn many of the suns in the galaxy red. The Legion was being hunted by Earth-Man and his villainous cohorts, who had dubbed themselves the "Justice League of Earth". After telling the Legionnaires that Brainiac 5 sent him here, Superman, Dawnstar, Colossal Boy, and Wildfire head to his likely location: an alien holding camp. Superman and the others encounter two more Legionnaires: Night Girl and Shadow Lass, who lead them to an improvised underground headquarters from which over ten thousand extraterrestrials have escaped to their home planets. Timber Wolf and Lightning Lass are revealed to be running the interstellar "underground railroad". After a short reunion, Superman and his Legionnaire friends are discovered by Earth-Man and are attacked by the Justice League of Earth. Wildfire, Dawnstar, Colossal Boy, and Superman manage to escape through a warp-gate to Colu, where they crash land, and are attacked by the seemingly brainwashed residents. After blacking out, Superman awakens and is confronted by Brainiac 5, who reveals that his dictatorship of the planet is fabricated as a way to keep Colu, which is the strategic beachhead of a proposed United Planets attack on Earth, from completing their plans.

On Earth, Chameleon Girl sneaks into the Justice League's headquarters. She discovers that they captured Sun Boy and placed him into a machine that uses his powers to tint the sun red. Superman, Brainiac 5, and Colossal Boy find the other Legionnaires and the crystal data tablet containing the false claims regarding Superman's origins.

Earth-Man reveals himself, steals Colossal Boy's power, and proceeds to attack Superman, gloating about how he has forever ruined Superman's name. Superman takes the fight outside the station and pushes Earth-Man into outer space. Meanwhile, the attack force of the United Planets waits for the signal to attack Earth.

Brainiac 5 manages to free Sun Boy from the machine. Once he returns to consciousness, Earth's sun once again emits yellow rays, restoring Superman's powers. The Man of Steel is then able to face Earth-Man on equal footing, convincing Earth's people of the truth of his origins in the process. With the Legion's help, Superman is able to subdue Earth-Man. With the Justice League of Earth defeated, the Legion set about rebuilding and making plans to find their lost teammates. Before leaving for his era, Superman tells the Legion to let him know when they need his help. The Justice League of Earth were defeated and imprisoned on the prison planet Takron-Galtos.

During the "Final Crisis" storyline, Earth Man, Golden Boy, Storm Boy, and Tusker appear as members of Superboy-Prime's Legion of Super-Villains.

Members
 Earth Man (Kirt Niedrigh) - He can absorb and duplicate the abilities of metahumans and aliens alike.
 Golden Boy (Klint Stewirt) - He can change the structure of any element into gold just by touching them.
 Radiation Roy (Roy Travich) - He emits radiation.
 Spider Girl (Sussa Paka) - She has super-strong prehensile hair.
 Storm Boy (Myke Chypurz) - He can control the weather.
 Tusker (Horace Lafeaugh) - He has ivory-like tusks that can grow to certain sizes as well as enhanced durability, a healing factor, and enhanced strength, agility, and reflexes.

References

External links
 Justice League of Earth at DC Comics Wiki

Legion of Super-Heroes
DC Comics supervillain teams